Arzúa is a municipality in the autonomous community of Galicia in the province of A Coruña in northwestern Spain. It has an area of 155.89 km², a population of 6,315 (2012 estimate), and a population density of 40.64 people/km². It is one of the Galician municipalities with more cows per capita rate in Galicia.

Although the region has long been settled, even pre-dating Roman occupation, the current population of the town are mostly of Basque extraction.

The village is for many pilgrims the last stopping point before the last day trek into Santiago de Compostella. The French Way and the Northern Way (Camino del Norte) of Camino join in a single path in Arzúa before arriving to Santiago.

Demographics

References

Municipalities in the Province of A Coruña